Rubén Arriaza Pazos (born 26 August 1979) is a Spanish retired footballer who played as a defensive midfielder.

Football career
Born in Jerez de la Frontera, Province of Cádiz, Pazos played most of his career in the Spanish third division, representing several clubs. He started his senior career with Real Madrid C, in the fourth level.

From June 2004 to January 2007, Pazos had an unassuming spell in division two for hometown side Xerez CD, making his debut in the competition on 12 September 2004 by coming on as a 78th-minute substitute in a 1–0 home win against Polideportivo Ejido. In the summer of 2008, he signed with Racing Club Portuense.

References

External links

1979 births
Living people
Footballers from Jerez de la Frontera
Spanish footballers
Association football midfielders
Segunda División players
Segunda División B players
Tercera División players
Real Madrid C footballers
AD Ceuta footballers
Xerez CD footballers
Zamora CF footballers
Lorca Deportiva CF footballers
Atlético Sanluqueño CF players